Luis Ricceri (in Italian Luigi Ricceri; May 8, 1901 – June 15, 1989) was a Catholic Roman priest of the Salesians of Don Bosco, who was the 6th Rector Major of that Order between 1965 and 1977. He was the first Superior of the Salesians after the Second Vatican Council, leading a Special Chapter of the Order to update it to the new regulations of the Church. In this context, he used the sentence "Forward with Don Bosco alive today, in order to respond to the needs of our time and the expectations of the Church" that after would become "With Don Bosco and the times." He transferred the Salesian General Headquarters from its original place in Turin to Rome.

References 

1901 births
1989 deaths
People from Mineo
Salesians of Don Bosco
20th-century Italian Roman Catholic priests
Religious leaders from the Province of Catania